Ceratocyba is a monotypic genus of East African dwarf spiders containing the single species, Ceratocyba umbilicaris. It was first described by Å. Holm in 1962, and has only been found in Kenya.

See also
 List of Linyphiidae species

References

Endemic fauna of Kenya
Linyphiidae
Monotypic Araneomorphae genera
Spiders of Africa